Rissa may refer to:

Animals
Rissa (bird), genus of birds known as kittiwakes
Rissa brevirostris, also known as the red-legged kittiwake 
Rissa tridactyla, also known as the black-legged kittiwake

People
Rissa (artist) (born 1938), German artist and wife of Karl Otto Götz

Places
Rissa, Norway, a former municipality in the old Sør-Trøndelag county, Norway
Rissa, also known as Årnset, a village in Indre Fosen municipality in Trøndelag county, Norway
Rissa Church, a church in Leira in Indre Fosen municipality in Trøndelag county, Norway

Other
, a Finnish merchant ship in service 1955-61
Rissa IL, a Norwegian sports club from Rissa, Norway